WPKA-LP (99.9 FM) is a radio station licensed to serve the community of Apopka, Florida. The station is owned by VJIL Inc. It airs a Regional Mexican format.

The station was assigned the WPKA-LP call letters by the Federal Communications Commission on March 7, 2014.

References

External links
 Official Website
 

PKA-LP
PKA-LP
Radio stations established in 2014
2014 establishments in Florida
Regional Mexican radio stations in the United States
PKA-LP
Orange County, Florida